Bergelson may refer to:

 David Bergelson, Soviet Yiddish language writer
 Vitaly Bergelson, US mathematical researcher